Maurice Kirya (born 4 November 1984) is a Ugandan singer, songwriter, actor, and humanitarian. He is a celebrated household name in East Africa with over a decade-long wealth of experience in the music industry.

The 2010 RFI (Radio France Internationale) Discoveries Award winner  Maurice is credited as the pioneer of Ugandan soul music – a style he’s aptly dubbed ‘’Mwooyo’’ A style and culture appreciated by his massive social media followers, fans & music enthusiasts.

Kirya has performed in over 35 Countries, and collaborated in performances with the likes of American superstar, NE-YO, German superstar Mark Forster, and American actor and idols winner Jordin Sparks.

Maurice has also featured in Hollywood films like The Queen Of Katwe as 'Theo' (alongside Lupita Nyongo & David Oyelowo, he has also acted in The Last King of Scotland as himself (Not credited) starring Forest Whitaker, Kerry Washington & David Oyelowo. Kirya is currently Starring in ‘The Girl In the Yellow Jumper’’ an upcoming movie directed by Loukman Ali.

He is the C.E.O/Founder of 'The Sound Cup Coffee' A Premium Coffee Brand that started as a restaurant in 2013. He is also C.E.O/Founder of 'Piz & Pots', a Ugandan based Branding Agency. Piz & Pots is the company that also runs the annual music festival KIRYALIVE FESTIVAL in Kampala that hosts musicians from within the country and around the world.

Kirya is a youth & health activist  who is also collaborating with the organisation Hijra, & UNHCR in Uganda  in the efforts to protect the lives and rights of refugees.

Due to his passion for wild life conservation, Kirya was named as a WILD AID ambassador alongside powerful names such as actor Jackie Chan, Tony Jaa & Li Bing Bing, musician and actress. He won RFI’s 2010 Discoveries Music Award. He won prize money plus a grant worth 18,000 euros to develop his career. He staged performances in Paris plus a year-long tour of Africa where he toured over 35 countries. He was nominated for the most gifted afro pop video of the year in the 2012 channel O video music awards. He was one of the three Ugandan artists to perform at the inaugural annual Tribe One Festival, in South Africa.

Maurice Kirya comes from a musical family, his late mother used to sit them around the fire every time there was a power black out, which was a common thing, she then would teach them folk songs and rhymes, his love for singing was ignited in these dark warm nights.
He fuses his Uganda style, Mwooyo with rnb, soul & jazz.
He plays guitar, bass & piano and writes all his music.
When asked how he writes his music, he always responded ‘’I see the picture, i feel the emotion,i relate and the song comes to me’’

He has toured over 35 Countries and 40 Cities across Africa, Europe and America. His interesting style of music and persona has landed him big interviews on BBC, CNN, Voice of America and RFI.  He has grown to be an inspiration and mentor to many young Ugandan and African musicians, He also uses music and the knowledge he has to support the youth and the refugees in UGANDA by teaching them how to use the arts to empower their lives.

Discography

Albums
Misubbaawa, 2009
The book of Kirya, 2012
Mwooyo, 2015
Free Dreams, 2017
Beyond Myself,2019

Singles
To Love You
Munonde
Gimme Light
So Cold
Busaabala
Never Been Loved
Njagala gwe
Njagala gwe Rmx
Beera Naabo
Beera Naabo Rmx
Binadamu featuring AY
Let’s go!
Stop
Stop RMX
Boda Boda
Tell Me
Village girl featuring Valerie Kimani
Locals and native feat Indigenous
Revolution
Revolution Rmx feat Navio & Da myth
Silent Night
Work it out
Bemoola
Money
Hold on and holy ghost ft Ruyonga

Filmography
The Last King of Scotland
The Queen of Katwe as "Theo"
The Girl in the Yellow Jumper

References

External links 
"Uganda's Maurice Kirya Opens His Book"
"Started From The Bottom: Uganda’s Maurice Kirya Remembers His 2005 Struggles"
lifestyleuganda.com

1984 births
21st-century Ugandan male singers
Living people
People from Kampala
Kumusha